Coal Rock is a prominent nunatak lying  southeast of Fierle Peak at the south end of the Forrestal Range, Pensacola Mountains. It was mapped by the United States Geological Survey (USGS) from surveys and from U.S. Navy air photos, 1956–66, and named by Dwight L. Schmidt, USGS geologist to these mountains, for the Permian coal that is well exposed on the nunatak.

References 

Rock formations of Queen Elizabeth Land